"Campaign Speech" is a freestyle rap song by American rapper Eminem, released on October 19, 2016, the same day of the third United States presidential debate, and 19 days before the 2016 presidential election. It was then released on October 22, 2016 on iTunes and streaming services such as Spotify.

Composition
"Campaign Speech" is one of Eminem's longest songs to date and runs for nearly eight minutes, consisting of only one verse and no hook. In the song, Eminem disses Donald Trump and mentions other famous people such as Edward Norton, George Zimmerman, Dylann Roof, Colin Kaepernick, Robin Thicke, Ben Stiller and David Hasselhoff. The song features controversial lyrics, mostly regarding Roof, Trump, and Zimmerman.

Release
On October 18, 2016, Eminem teased the single on his official Facebook page and mentioned that an upcoming album was in production.
On Twitter, Eminem posted "Don't worry I'm working on an album! Here's something meanwhile", linking the song.

Charts

References

2016 singles
2016 songs
2016 United States presidential election in popular culture
Diss tracks
Eminem songs
Songs about Donald Trump
Songs written by Eminem
Songs written by Luis Resto (musician)
Political rap songs